"The Way" is a song by American contemporary Christian music singer and songwriter Jeremy Camp from his 2010 album We Cry Out: The Worship Project. It was released on August 9, 2011, as the second single. The song became Camp's sixth Hot Christian Songs No. 1, staying there for two weeks. It lasted 42 weeks on the overall chart. The song is played in a B minor key, and 80 beats per minute.

Background 
"The Way" was released on August 9, 2011, as the second single from his seventh studio album, We Cry Out: The Worship Project. The song is one of his personal favorites from the album, about identifying Jesus as the way of life. They nearly had the album complete until Jeremy’s brother-in-law, Brad Peens, gave him an idea for a song that included an African choir. Jeremy gathered a few more ideas for the song, and they re-wrote it together. In an interview with "The Worship Community", Jeremy explained the feel he was trying to show in the song, “It’s very anthemic, a world-wide kind of song. It feels like a war song, a cry of God’s glory.”

Music video
The music video for the single "The Way" was released on August 15, 2011.

Track listing
Digital download
"The Way" – 3:57
Digital download (acoustic)
"The Way" – 4:05

Charts

Weekly charts

Year-end charts

References

2010 songs
2011 singles